The February 2004 Nabire earthquakes began on February 6 at 06.05 WIT in Papua, Indonesia. The first of three large earthquakes measured 7.0 on the moment magnitude scale. It was followed a few days later by two strong shocks, measuring  7.3 and 6.7, respectively. The earthquakes were felt at Nabire with a maximum Mercalli intensity of VI (Strong). At least 37 people were killed and were 682 injured, and over 2,600 buildings were damaged or destroyed.

Tectonic setting
Eastern Indonesia is broadly characterized by complex tectonics in which motions of numerous small microplates are accommodating large-scale convergence between the Australian, Pacific, Philippine Sea, and Sunda plates. The interactions of these microplates produce all possible faulting mechanisms. The region is seismically active—a magnitude 7.9 earthquake in 1979 was among the strongest ever recorded.

Earthquakes
According to the United States Geological Survey, the February 5 earthquake was the result of shallow oblique normal faulting on or near a transform fault. A focal mechanism of the event indicate it occurred on either a near-vertical right-lateral strike-slip fault trending southeast-northwest, or on a shallower left-lateral fault striking towards the northeast, parallel to the regional plate boundary. The February 7 earthquake was the result of shallow strike-slip faulting in approximately the same fault area. Rupture during the second earthquake occurred on either a left-lateral east-west oriented fault or a right-lateral fault trending north-south.

The earthquakes struck along the transform fault boundary which separates the Birds Head and the Maoke plates. The east-northeast trending boundary accommodates approximately /yr of left-lateral motion. While the February 7 earthquake slightly oblique to this orientation, the east-west plane of its focal mechanism is more consistent with motion along this plate boundary.

Impact
The initial earthquake on February 5 caused 37 fatalities and left 682 injured. Around the epicenter area, at least 2,678 structures were damaged or destroyed, including nine bridges. An official said that many people died due to collapsing homes. In Nabire, the airport runway was damaged and power outages were reported. The walls of many buildings toppled, including those of homes, places of worship, and offices. Telecommunication services were interrupted. Downtown Nabrie was extensively damaged; a hospital, the court building, and many shophouses were destroyed. Some residential areas and a local market caught fire. Bridges collapsed, roads cracked, and many trees fell. A leak was discovered at a Pertamina oil refinery. There were no casualties reported from the larger earthquake on February 7 despite that being anticipated.

Aftermath
Earlier reports indicated that 22 people had died and over 100 were injured, but officials said the casualty numbers were expected to rise. The injured were taken to various hospitals, including one who was transported to Surabaya. Two victims died while being treated. The Biak Numfor Regency government said that they were ready to assist the affected people. The first aircraft carrying relief supplies arrived at Nabire airport on February 9. Some victims were treated at the Nabire Hospital, which sustained damage. Survivors took refuge in tents outside their homes for fear of aftershocks. The Indonesian Red Cross provided assistance to medical professionals in the area. A medical team from Jayapura was expected to arrive on February 10. The Australian government provided AU $50 thousand to the International Federation of the Red Cross for relief supplies such as personal hygiene kits, tents, tarpaulins and blankets. It also said that should the Indonesian government request for assistance, it would provide assistance.

See also 
 List of earthquakes in 2004
 List of earthquakes in Indonesia

References

External links

Earthquake in Indonesia (Papua province)

2004 disasters in Indonesia
2004 earthquakes
2004 in Indonesia
Papua (province)
February 2004 events in Asia
Central Papua
Earthquakes in Indonesia